Richland is the name of some places in the U.S. state of Wisconsin:

Richland Center, Wisconsin, a city
Richland, Richland County, Wisconsin, a town
Richland, Rusk County, Wisconsin, a town